Adastra Films is a film production and distribution company based in Cannes, France. It was founded in March 2008 by Sébastien Aubert and David Guiraud.

History
Adastra Films develops films (fiction, animation or documentaries) by French and international artists, from the scriptwriting to the promotion in festivals.

The company produces in 2014 its first full-length movie called Brides (2014 film) that has been selected in the Panorama Section of the 64th Berlin International Film Festival among movies such as Yves Saint Laurent (film) and famous directors, such as Michel Gondry, or Tsai Ming-liang.
Its second feature-length film The Strange Ones starring Alex Pettyfer and James Jackson-Freedson is a French- American co-production with Stay Gold Features, Relic Pictures in association with Archer Gray, Gamechanger Films and Storyboard Entertainment. In 2017 the film won the Jury Prize at the Champs-Élysées Film Festival and was part of the official selection of South by Southwest where the actor James Jackson-Freedson won the Best Breakthrough performance.

The company owns a catalogue composed of awarded short films, selected in famous festival (Sundance Film Festival, South by Southwest (SXSW), Palm Springs International Film Festival, Clermont-Ferrand International Short Film Festival...) and often broadcast on national TV channels (Canal+, France 2, France 3, RTP2.
In total, these short films count more than 1500 selections in worldwide festivals, and more than 300 awards.

In 2014, Adastra Films received "The Award for Best Emerging Producer in France 2014 by France Télévisions", and in 2015 during the Cannes Film Festival, Adastra was part of the "Futur Leaders 2015: Producers" list, made by Screen Daily Magazine.

Production
 2017 : The Strange Ones, directed by Lauren Wolkstein and Christopher Radcliff (United States)
 2016 : Alpha Pill, directed by Vincent Diderot (France) 
 2016 : Red Night, directed by Yann Pierre (France)
 2016 : Falling Prey, directed by David Guiraud (France)
 2015 : Story of Nothing, (aka Mine de Rien) directed by Grzegorz Jaroszuk (France/Poland)
 2015 : Maxiplace, directed by Vincent Diderot (France)
 2015 : M seeking W, directed by Marina Moshkova (Russia)
 2014 : Brides directed by Tinatin Kajrishvili (Georgia)
 2014 : Jonathan's Chest, directed by Chris Radcliff (United States)
 2012 : Social Butterfly, directed by Lauren Wolkstein (United States)
 2012 : The Assistant (aka L'assistante), directed by David Guiraud and Anne-Claire Jaulin (France)
 2012 : Black Mulberry (aka Shavi Tuta), directed by Gabriel Razmadze (Georgia)
 2011 : Le Nid (aka Nest), directed by Tornike Bziava (Georgia)
 2011 : The Strange Ones (aka Deux Inconnus), directed by Lauren Wolkstein and Chris Radcliff (United States)
 2010 : I am Agha, directed by Atif Ahmad et Muhammad Umar Saeed (Pakistan)
 2010 : Jour 0, directed by Vincent Diderot (France)
 2009 : In Scale (aka V Mashtabe), directed by Marina Moshkova (Russia)
 2009 : Le Tonneau des Danaïdes, directed by David Guiraud (France)

Distribution
 2015 : Domingo, directed by  Raúl López Echeverría (Mexico)
 2015 : Pitter Patter, Goes My Heart directed by  Christoph Rainer (Austria, Germany, USA)
 2015 : Two Sisters, directed by  Keola Racela (United States)
 2015 : Jackie, directed by  Giedrius Tamoševičius (Lithuania)
 2015 : Midland, directed by Oliver Bernsen (United States)
 2014 : Beach Flags, directed by Sarah Saïdan (Iran/France)
 2013 : La Fugue, directed by Jean-Bernard Marlin, (France)
 2012 : Penny Dreadful, directed by Shane Atkinson (United States)
 2012 : Bad Toys 2, directed by Daniel Brunet & Nicolas Douste (France)
 2012 : Frozen Stories, directed by Grzegorz Jaroszuk (Poland)
 2012 : Wolf Carver, directed by Aino Suni (Finland)
 2010 : Tasnim, directed by Elite Zexer (Israël)
 2010 : The April Chill, directed by Tornike Bziava (Georgia)
 2009 : Helpless, directed by Li Yang (China)
 2009 : Cigarette Candy, directed by Lauren Wolkstein (United States)
 2009 : Ma Poubelle Géante, directed by Uda Benyamina (France)
 2009 : La Révélation, directed by Vincent Diderot (France)

Awards and selections

Awards :
 Silver Hobby Horse at the 2015 Krakow Film Festival

Selections:
 Vébron International Film  Festival (France)
Broadcasting
 France 2
 OCS

Awards :
 Student Prize at the Reims toi l'oeil (France) Festival

Selections:
 CinemadaMare Film Festival
 Filmets Baladona Film Festival
 Fantasia International Film Festival

Broadcasting
 Pacific Voice
 Mediaset
 OCS

Awards :
 Animation Award at the 2015 Alta Langa Film Festival
 Best Animation Award at the 2015 Vébron International Film Festival

Selections:
 CinemadaMare Film Festival

Broadcasting
 France 3
 Pacific Voice

First selection :
 World premiere in 2014 at Sundance Film Festival

Awards including :
 Best short fiction movie at Oak Cliff Film Festival
 Best short movie at Victoria TX Independent Film Festival

Over 30 selections including :
 World premiere in 2013 at Sundance Film Festival
 South by Southwest (SXSW) 
 Palm Springs International Festival of Short Films
 Atlanta Film Festival
 Curtas Vila do Conde
 Independent Film Festival of Boston
 Maryland Film Festival

In 2013, the movie was nominated for the "Lutins du court métrage ", a French reward for the best fictions of the year.
The Strange Ones was among the 17th best French fictions of the year.

Over 20 awards including :
 Best short movie and "Golden Starfish Price" at Hamptons International Film Festival
 Best fiction short movie at Atlanta Film Festival (Festival Oscar list)
 Special Jury Award at Filmets - Badalona Film Festival
 Revelation Award at the Brest European Short Film Festival

Over 100 selections including :
 World premiere in 2011 at Sundance Film Festival, founded by Robert Redford
 Clermont-Ferrand International Short Film Festival
 South by Southwest
 Melbourne International Film Festival
 Chicago International Film Festival
 San Francisco International Film Festival
 Woodstock Film Festival

TV Broadcasting :
 France 2 "Histoires Courtes" 

Awards :
 Grand Jury Mention at the Festival du court métrage en plein air de Grenoble

Over 30 selections including :
 Sundance Film Festival
 Uppsala (Out of Competition)
 Palm Springs International Festival of Short Films
 Short Shorts Film Festival
 Cork Film Festival
 Rhode Island International Film Festival
 Brest European Short Film Festival
 Festival international du court-métrage de Lille
 Festival Côté Court
 Alcine
 IFF Molodist
 Odense International Film Festival

Over 20 awards including :
 GOLDEN FISH at VauFest International Video Art & Short Film Festival
 Best animation movie at PLANETE DOC FILM FESTIVAL
 Special Jury Award and RTP2 Award at CINANIMA Film Festival
 Special Jury Mention at Visionaria Film Festival
 Special Jury Mention at ANIMADRID Film Festival
 Best animation Award at Sapporo International Short Film Festival

Over 80 selections including :
 Uppsala
  Message to Man International Film Festival
 Festival International du court-métrage de Lille
 Tabor Film Festival 
 International Film festival Innsbruck
  Tofifest International Film Festival
 Alpinale Short Film Festival Nenzing
 São Paulo International Film Festival

References

Film production companies of France